Pluscula is a genus of marine snails, gastropod molluscs in the superfamily Philinoidea within the clade Cephalaspidea. It is monotypic, being represented by the single species, Pluscula cuica.

Distribution 
This species occurs off Sao Paulo, Brazil.

References

Plusculidae
Gastropods described in 1953